Innocence is a 2020 South Korean crime drama film written and directed by Park Sang-hyun. The film stars Shin Hye-sun, Bae Jong-ok, and Heo Joon-ho. It follows a lawyer who defends her mother on trial for murder.

Innocence was theatrically released on June 10, 2020. The film received positive reviews from critics, who praised the performances of the cast.

Plot
Based on a real-life story, the film focuses on Ahn Jung-in (Shin Hye-sun), a lawyer who decides to defend her mother after she is wrongly accused of killing someone at her husband's funeral.

Cast

Main
 Shin Hye-sun as Ahn Jung-in
 Bae Jong-ok as Chae Hwa-ja
 Heo Joon-ho as Mayor Choo
 Hong Kyung as Ahn Jung-soo

Supporting
 Tae Hang-ho as Yang Wang-yong
 Ko Chang-seok as Seedsman
 Park Chul-min as Hwang Bang-younh
 Kim Su-hyeon as law firm vice president
 Cha Soon-bae as Na Il-jung
 Jung In-gyeom as Public prosecutor Shin
 Han Yi-jin as Choi Seok-goo
 Shin Cheol-jin as Ji Young-deok

Special appearances
 Kim Young-jae as Director Park
 Kim Suk-hoon as Lim Choon-woo
 Park Sung-geun as law firm representative
 Bae Hae-sun as Mayor Choo's wife
 Park Jin-young as High Court judge

Production

Casting
On November 8, 2018, actresses Shin Hye-sun and Bae Jong-ok were confirmed to star in the courtroom film Innocence. Han Yi-jin was confirmed to have joined the cast on December 11, followed by Tae Hang-ho on December 12.

The film marks Shin Hye-sun's first major role in a film. She revealed that one of the reasons why she chose this film is because her father advised her to. She added that "such female-led legal dramas are not common these days, and [her] fans wanted [her] to play the role of a lawyer someday due to [her] clear diction." Shin used Elizabeth Sloane (the main character of the 2016 American film Miss Sloane, played by Jessica Chastain) as a source of inspiration while preparing for her role.

Bae Jong-ok chose to play Jung-in's mother "out of thirst for an acting transformation" as her character looks 30 years older than her. She also accepted to play in the film because she "wondered how complicated and twisted relationships between neighbors can get if their respective families have a history between them."

According to director Park Sang-hyun, the role of the mayor could only be played by Heo Joon-ho as the character "is rumored to have perfectly pulled off a double-faced man full of greed and corruption."

Filming
Principal photography began on December 3, 2018 and filming was completed on February 28, 2019.

Release
The film was originally set to be released on March 5, 2020. Due to the COVID-19 pandemic, promotional events were cancelled and the distributor decided to postpone the release to May 27. After a new cluster emerged in central Seoul in mid-May, the release was pushed back to June. On May 22, it was announced that the film would hit theaters on June 11. On June 4, it was announced that the film would be released one day earlier, on June 10.

Reception

Box office
The film topped the South Korean box office during its opening weekend, with an estimated 203,000 moviegoers. It surpassed 500,000 ticket sales the following week.

Awards and nominations

References

External links
 
 

2020 films
2020s Korean-language films
2020s legal drama films
Films about lawyers
Films postponed due to the COVID-19 pandemic
Legal drama films
South Korean courtroom films
South Korean drama films